The Rivière des Trois Pointes is a tributary of the rivière aux Anglais flowing in the unorganized territory Rivière-aux-Outardes, in the Manicouagan Regional County Municipality, in the administrative region of Côte-Nord, in the province of Quebec, in Canada.

The Trois Pointes river valley is mainly served by the English river path.

The surface of the Trois Pointes river is generally frozen from the beginning of December to the end of March, except the rapids areas; however, safe circulation on the ice is generally from mid-December to mid-March.

Geography 
The Trois Pointes river originates on the Canadian Shield, at a small unidentified lake.

  southeasterly in a straight line, crossing Lake Picard on its full length, to its mouth;
  first towards the south-east in a deep valley to the outlet (coming from the north) of Lac du Serpent; then towards the south relatively in a straight line, crossing for a hundred meters a small bay of Lac des Chutes, until at its mouth;

The Trois Pointes river flows on the north bank of the Lac La Chesnaye, which is crossed to the northeast by the current of the rivière aux Anglais, in the unorganized territory of Rivière-aux-Outardes.

Toponym 
The place names "Rivière des Trois Pointes" and "Lac des Trois Pointes" originate from the fact that this lake has three bays, each ending in a point.

The toponym "Trois Pointes River" was formalized on August 2, 1974, at the Place Names Bank of the Commission de toponymie du Québec.

See also 

 List of rivers of Quebec

References

External links 
 

Rivers of Côte-Nord
Manicouagan Regional County Municipality